David John Alfred Clines (21 November 1938 – 8 December 2022) was a biblical scholar. He served as professor at the University of Sheffield.

Education 
Clines was born in Sydney, Australia, and studied at the University of Sydney and St John’s College, Cambridge.

Career 
He served as president of the Society for Old Testament Study, as well as president of the Society of Biblical Literature. In 2003, a Festschrift was published in his honour. Reading from Right to Left: Essays on the Hebrew Bible in Honour of David J.A. Clines included contributions by James Barr, John Barton, Joseph Blenkinsopp, Walter Brueggemann, Brevard Childs, Patrick D. Miller, Rolf Rendtorff, Hugh Williamson, and Ellen van Wolde. In 2013, he was honoured with another Festschrift, Interested Readers: Essays on the Hebrew Bible in Honor of David J. A. Clines, which included contributions from Marc Zvi Brettler, Norman C. Habel, and Athalya Brenner.

Clines served as president of the Society of Biblical Literature in 2009. Together with David M. Gunn, Clines made the University of Sheffield a pioneer in literary readings of the final form of the biblical text. Followers of this approach are sometimes referred to as the "Sheffield school". 

Clines died on 8 December 2022.

Honours
In 2015, Clines was awarded the Burkitt Medal by the British Academy "in recognition of his significant contribution to the study of the Hebrew Bible and Hebrew lexicography".

Selected works

Books
 
 
 
 
 
 
 
 
 
 
 

sources of bibliography

Edited by

Chapters

Journal articles
 
 
 
  Reprinted in On the Way to the Postmodern: Old Testament Essays, 1967–1998 (Sheffield Academic Press, 1998), Vol. 2, pp. 830–839.

Festschriften

References

Citations

Sources
 

1938 births
2022 deaths
Academics of the University of Sheffield
Alumni of St John's College, Cambridge
Arminian theologians
Australian biblical scholars
Bible commentators
Old Testament scholars
People from Sydney
University of Sydney alumni
Presidents of the Society for Old Testament Study